Yip, YIP, or yips may refer to:


People
 Yip (nickname), a list of people
 Ye (surname), a Chinese surname also romanized as Yip (葉), including a list of people

Arts and entertainment
 Yip, a fictional race living in Winkie Country in the Land of Oz
 Yips, a fictional group of people in Jack Vance's science fiction Cadwal Chronicles trilogy 
 "The Yips" (How I Met Your Mother), an episode of the TV series How I Met Your Mother

Other uses
 Yips, a sports-related problem
 American slang for cocaine
 Youth International Party, a youth movement founded in 1967
 Yeast integrating plasmid or yeast integrative plasmid, a type of yeast plasmid
 YIP, IATA airport code for Willow Run Airport, Michigan
 yip, ISO 639-3 code for the Pholo language of China

See also